George Steele (1937–2017) was an American professional wrestler.

George Steele may also refer to:

George McKendree Steele (1823–1902), American educator and Methodist minister
George P. Steele (1924–2018), vice admiral in the United States Navy
George Washington Steele (1839–1922), American lawyer, soldier, and politician
George Gilliam Steele (1798–1855), American architect

See also
George Steel (disambiguation)